Plakina trilopha is a species of sponge in the order Homosclerophorida. It is native to the Mediterranean Sea and the Canary Islands. It was first described in 1880 by the German zoologist Franz Eilhard Schulze.

References

Homoscleromorpha
Fauna of the Atlantic Ocean
Fauna of the Mediterranean Sea
Animals described in 1880